Callenya lenya, the long-winged hedge blue, is a butterfly of the family Lycaenidae.

Distribution
Callenya lenya is found in southern Burma, Thailand, the Malay Peninsula and Borneo. In Kinabalu Park in Sabah, it is recorded from Kampung Kundasang, the Langganan waterfall, and Kampung Sayap. In Cambodia's Phnom Samkos Wildlife Sanctuary, it is found above 800 metres on the Khamaoch massif.

Subspecies
Callenya lenya lenya (southern Burma, Thailand, Malay Peninsula, Borneo)
Callenya lenya baluana (Sabah, Borneo)

Bibliography
 
 Corbet, A.S.,1940: "Observations on Species of Lycaenidae from the Malay Peninsula (Lepid., Rhop.)". Proceedings Royal Entomological Society, London. (B)9(1):1-6, 7 figures.

References

Polyommatini
Butterflies of Borneo